Sebastian Schiek (born 20 March 1990) is a German professional footballer who plays as a right-back.

Career
He made his debut for Karlsruher SC in August 2011, as a substitute for Dennis Kempe in a 2–0 defeat to Energie Cottbus in the 2. Bundesliga.

He signed for Fortuna Köln in summer 2018 after his contract expired at his previous club.

Having been without a contract since leaving Fortuna Köln in the summer of 2019, he signed for VfR Aalen on a contract until summer 2020 in January 2020.

He returned to Sonnenhof Großaspach in August 2020.

References

External links

Living people
1990 births
German footballers
People from Bruchsal
Sportspeople from Karlsruhe (region)
Footballers from Baden-Württemberg
Association football fullbacks
Karlsruher SC players
Karlsruher SC II players
SG Sonnenhof Großaspach players
SC Fortuna Köln players
VfR Aalen players
2. Bundesliga players
3. Liga players
Regionalliga players